Jaime "Hurricane" Clampitt (born July 8, 1976 in Gravelbourg, Saskatchewan, Canada) is a female Canadian boxer.

Professional boxing record

See also
 List of female boxers

References

External links
 Jaime Clampitt at Awakening Fighters
 WBAN Women's boxing biography
 

1976 births
Living people
Sportspeople from Saskatchewan
People from Gravelbourg, Saskatchewan
Canadian women boxers
Lightweight boxers